Semaglutide, sold under the brand names Ozempic, Wegovy and Rybelsus, is an antidiabetic medication used for the treatment of type 2 diabetes and as anti-obesity medication for long-term weight management, developed by Novo Nordisk in 2012.

Semaglutide is a GLP-1 receptor agonist, meaning that it mimics the action of the human incretin glucagon-like peptide-1 (GLP-1), thereby increasing insulin secretion and increasing blood sugar disposal and improving glycemic control. Side effects include nausea, vomiting, diarrhea, abdominal pain, and constipation.

In 2020, semaglutide was the 129th most commonly prescribed medication in the United States, with more than 4million prescriptions.

Medical uses
Semaglutide is indicated as an adjunct to diet and exercise to improve glycemic control in adults with type2 diabetes.

The higher-dose formulation of semaglutide is indicated as an adjunct to diet and exercise for long-term weight management in adults with obesity (initial body mass index (BMI) ≥ 30 kg/m2) or who are overweight (initial BMI ≥ 27 kg/m2) and have at least one weight-related comorbidity.

A review of anti-obesity treatments found that semaglutide as well as tirzepatide (which has an overlapping mechanism of action) were more promising than previous anti-obesity drugs, although less effective than bariatric surgery.

Adverse effects
Possible side effects include nausea, diarrhea, vomiting, constipation, abdominal pain, headache, fatigue, indigestion/heartburn, dizziness, bloating (abdominal distension), belching, low blood sugar (hypoglycemia) in patients with type 2 diabetes, gas (flatulence), gastroenteritis, and gastroesophageal reflux disease (GERD).

Contraindications 
Data from rodent studies of GLP-1-mediated thyroid C-cell hyperplasia indicates that use is contraindicated in people with a personal or family history of medullary thyroid carcinoma and in patients with multiple endocrine neoplasia syndrome type 2.

Mechanism of action
Semaglutide is a glucagon-like peptide-1 receptor agonist. By mimicking the action of the incretin glucagon-like peptide-1 (GLP-1), it increases the production of insulin, the hormone which lowers the blood sugar level. It also appears to enhance growth of pancreatic beta cells, which are responsible for insulin production and release. Additionally, it inhibits the production of glucagon, the hormone that increases glycogenolysis (release of stored carbohydrate from the liver) and gluconeogenesis (synthesis of new glucose). It reduces food intake by lowering appetite and slowing down digestion in the stomach, helping to reduce body fat. It reduces hunger, food craving and body fat.

Pharmacology
Semaglutide is chemically similar to human GLP-1, with 94% similarity. The only differences are two amino acid substitutions at positions 8 and 34, where alanine and lysine are replaced by 2-aminoisobutyric acid and arginine, respectively. Amino-acid substitution at position 8 prevents chemical breakdown by dipeptidyl peptidase-4. In addition, the lysine at position 26 is in its derivative form (acylated with stearic diacid). Acylation with a spacer and C-18 fatty diacid chain increases the drug's binding to blood protein (albumin), which enables longer presence in the blood circulation.

Semaglutide's half-life in the blood is about seven days (165–184 hours). It can be administered by subcutaneous injection once weekly or once-daily by mouth.  Based on its half-life and dosing frequency, it can be expected to accumulate more after each injection of the same dose or increasing dose.  For this reason, patients may experience an increase in adverse effects throughout each 4-week phase of the same dose, and a possible increase in the satiety-inducing activity over the 4-week period.

For a given dose of semaglutide subcutaneous injection, the drug will accumulate in the blood more after each injection until steady-state is reached. Steady-state is expected to occur between 28 and 35 days of repeat weekly dosing of the same dose. This is directly related to the absorption and elimination rate constants, which are reported to be 0.0286 and 0.00413 (fraction/hour), respectively. The peak and trough plasma concentrations are expected to vary by 30% during steady state (a 30% reduction from peak to trough). Note: the steady-state concentration will vary based on patient-specific factors. No significant difference in the decrease from baseline body weight was observed between groups taking it orally (20 mg and 40-mg) or subcutaneously.

History
In 2012, a team of researchers at Novo Nordisk developed semaglutide for a once-weekly diabetes therapy as a longer-acting alternative to liraglutide. It was given the brand name Ozempic. Clinical trials were started in January 2016, and completed in May 2017.

Society and culture

Legal status 
In December 2016, the US FDA New Drug Application (NDA) was filed, and in October 2017, the FDA Advisory Committee approved it unanimously.

In December 2017, the injectable version with the brand name Ozempic was approved for use by people with diabetes in the United States,  and in January 2018, in Canada.

In February 2018, authorization was granted in the European Union,  in March 2018 in Japan, and in August 2019 in Australia.

In September 2019, a version which can be taken by mouth (Rybelsus) was approved for medical use in the United States, and in the European Union in April 2020.

In June 2021, a higher-dose injection version sold under the brand name Wegovy was approved by the US Food and Drug Administration as anti-obesity medication for long-term weight management in adults. In November 2021, the Committee for Medicinal Products for Human Use (CHMP) of the European Medicines Agency (EMA) recommended to grant a marketing authorization to Wegovy. to Novo Nordisk A/S. In January 2022, Wegovy was approved for medical use in the European Union.

In January 2023, the label for Rybelsus was updated to reflect that it can be used as a first-line treatment for adults with type2 diabetes.

Cost to patients
In the US, Wegovy has a list price of $1,349.02 per month per The New York Times, suggesting that because of the high costs many people "who could most benefit from weight loss may be unable to afford such expensive drugs".

In the UK semaglutide is available on NHS prescription for diabetes and obesity, at nominal or no cost to patients.

Research 
In 2021, semaglutide was found to be inferior to tirzepatide when used once weekly as add-on therapy to metformin in people with type2 diabetes (SURPASS-2), in both endpoints of reduction in A1C and body weight, with a roughly similar safety profile.

A 2014 meta-analysis including a small number of patients found that semaglutide may be effective in lowering liver enzymes (transaminitis) and improving certain radiologically observed features of metabolic-dysfunction–associated fatty-liver disease (MAFLD).

References

External links 
 
 

Antiobesity drugs
Glucagon-like peptide-1 receptor agonists
Peptide hormones